Charles Chaloner Ogle (1851–1878) was an English journalist, killed while reporting on the war in the Balkans.

Biography

Ogle, fourth son of John Ogle of St. Clare, near Ightham, Sevenoaks, Kent, was born on 16 April 1851, and educated, with other pupils, under his father at St. Clare. He matriculated at the University of London in June 1869, and then devoted himself to the study of architecture, becoming a pupil of Frederick William Roper of 9 Adam Street, Adelphi, London. He was a contributor to the ‘Builder,’ and in 1872 he both obtained a certificate for excellence in architectural construction and was admitted an associate of the Royal Institute of British Architects. Soon afterwards he visited Rome, and in August 1875 went for some months to Athens, where he worked in the office of Herr Ziller, the royal architect.

While thus engaged, the proprietors of the ‘Times’ newspaper accepted an offer of his services as their special correspondent in the war between Turkey and Herzegovina and the neighbouring provinces, and he accompanied the Turkish force against the Montenegrins. The letters written by Ogle from Montenegro and the Herzegovina, from Greece, from Crete, and from Thessaly, are full of picturesque details, brightened by a kindly humour. While residing at Volo, on the gulf of Thessaly, Ogle learned, on 28 March 1878, that an engagement was imminent between the Turkish troops and the insurgents occupying Mont Pelion and the town of Macrynitza. He at once proceeded to the scene of action, without arms and with a cane in his hand. The battle took place, and was prolonged to the following day, when Ogle, unable to obtain a horse to return to Volo, slept at Katochori on 29 and 30 March.

On 1 April his headless body was found lying in a ravine, and identified by a scar on the wrist and a blood-stained telegram in his pocket-book addressed to The Times. The body was taken on board H.M.S. Wizard, and conveyed to the Piræus, where it was accorded a public funeral on 10 April.

It was claimed that Ogle was assassinated by order of the Turkish commander, Amouss Aga, in revenge for reflections made on his pillaging a village. A report was circulated that the correspondent was aiding the insurgents. In a parliamentary paper, issued on 18 June, Ogle is blamed for imprudence in venturing among the belligerents, and his death was attributed to a wound received while retreating with the insurgents after the second battle of Macrynitza; but these statements were denied by friends.

References
 

English male journalists
Deaths by decapitation
Assassinated British journalists
Alumni of the University of London
1851 births
1871 deaths
19th-century British journalists
19th-century English male writers
People from Ightham